The Ukrainian mafia is a type of criminal organization with origins in Ukraine. Such organizations are regarded as one of the most influential types of organized crime coming out of the former USSR, including also the Russian mafia, the Georgian mafia, the Chechen mafia, the Armenian mafia and the Azerbaijani mafia. Ukrainian criminal organizations are involved in a significant number of illegal activities. Although Ukrainian criminal organizations are for the most part independently operating enterprises, they are sometimes connected with Russian mafia organizations, such as the case with Semyon Mogilevich.

History
Following the collapse of the former Soviet Union, there were large stockpiles of arms left in Ukraine. The rise of the Ukrainian mafia came from their participation in the illicit international trafficking in these arms. Between 1992 and 1998, some $32 billion in military material disappeared from military depots in Ukraine and ended up primarily in West Africa and Central Asia. At the time Ukrainian criminal organizations were also alleged to have trafficked weapons to war-torn places such as Afghanistan.

From trafficking in arms, Ukrainian crime syndicates entered into the international trade in illegal drugs, becoming a major player in the narcotics traffic from Central Asia to Central Europe. The reach of the Ukrainian criminal organizations has been reported from Central European countries such as the Czech Republic and Hungary, where they're involved in prostitution, to North American countries and Israel, where they found a significant power base following the mass immigration of Ukrainian Jews, most of whom were law-abiding citizens, but also included criminal elements intent on profiting illegally from the open borders.

In the 2000s, the Ukrainian mafia cooperated with the Neapolitan Camorra in the cigarette smuggling business. The Ukrainians would smuggle the cigarettes from Ukraine and Eastern Europe into Italy, where with the help of the Camorra it supplied the Neapolitan market. In recent years, the Camorra Contini clan is said to have cooperated in the same scheme with the Ukrainians.

The most infamous and well known form of Ukrainian organized crime is the so-called Odesa mafia named after the Black Sea port city of Odesa. Odesa is an infamous smugglers' haven and a key hub in post-Soviet global trafficking networks, not the least of which is moving Europe-bound Afghan heroin arriving from the Caucasus. Even in Ukraine's west, gangs are often closely involved in the lucrative trafficking of heroin, people, and counterfeit cigarettes into Europe, sometimes in cooperation with Russian mafia gangs.

Odesa traditionally had an ancient culture of banditry, dating back to the large and impoverished Jewish population. Famous writers such as Isaac Babel often wrote about the infamous exploits of Jewish gangsters, thieves and crime lords in the port city. 20th century thuggery made way for sophisticated organized crime when local crime lords began to use the city's sprawling port to their advantage. The at first locally active Odesa mafia, sometimes also called the Malina, became well known when it first branched out to New York City and later to Israel, when both countries gave the opportunity for Soviet Jews to emigrate. Many people from Odesa's Jewish population migrated abroad, among them a significant number of the city's most infamous career criminals. Although the gang was born in the city of Odesa, it has since established most of its headquarters in cities such as New York City, Miami, Tel Aviv, Antwerp and Budapest with brigades composed of former Odesan or Odesa-connected criminals active in a large number of other cities.

In the 1990s a powerful gang led by Alexander Angert, known as the Don of Odesa, Gennadiy Trukhanov, now the current mayor of Odesa, and Nickolay Fomichev established a large drug and arms trafficking scheme, after they made money in the oil industry. The gang branched out into Europe, using Italy as a base of their operations. According to the authorities, the notorious arms dealer Leonid Minin was also involved in the scheme.

In the United States the Odesa mafia is based in the Brighton Beach district of Brooklyn, New York. It is regarded as the most powerful post-Soviet criminal organization in the US and has since expanded its operations to Miami, Los Angeles and the San Francisco Bay area, where it has established connections with local Armenian and Israeli crime figures. It's known for being a very secretive organization and is involved in protection rackets, loan-sharking, murder-for-hire, narcotics trafficking, as well as the infamous fuel tax fraud rackets. Nonetheless a large amount of Odesa mafia-connected gangsters have become part of the US' criminal folklore, examples being Marat Balagula, Evsei Agron and Boris Nayfeld. Feuds, often resulting in extreme violence, happened in the 1980s and 1990s between Odesa gangsters such as the internal war between Balagula and Agron at first, and later on between the Nayfeld brothers and Monya Elson.

In popular culture 
 The Odesa Mob, or Odesa crime family, first appeared in Detective Comics edition #742 in March 2000 and has since featured in numerous Batman titles.
 The 2003 film The Italian Job features the character Mashkov (played by Olek Krupa), a high-ranking member of a Los Angeles Ukrainian mafia family.
 The 2005 film Lord of War tells the story of Ukrainian-American arms trafficker Yuri Orlov (played by Nicolas Cage, and based on Viktor Bout).
 A Ukrainian mafia family called the Zakarov Syndicate, which started out running sweatshops before moving into the crack cocaine trade in Chicago and gaining a foothold in Hong Kong, feature as antagonists in the 2007 video game Stranglehold.
 The Whisper Gang, a Ukrainian mob group operating in Gotham City and led by Luka Volk, made its first appearance in the Batman comics in January 2012 and later featured in the Gotham TV series' third season (2016).
 The Miami branch of a Kyiv-based crime syndicate called the Koshka Brotherhood, specializing in heroin and human trafficking, feature as the main antagonists in the seventh season of the television series Dexter (2012).
 In the TV series Banshee, they were the main antagonist for the first two seasons. They were led by a crime boss named Rabbit who got the main protagonist Lucas Hood arrested for a jewel heist and had people torture him in prison since he and his daughter Anna tried to steal from him. When Lucas got out of prison, he sent his thugs after him to kill him as well as track down his daughter. After the final shootout with the Ukrainian mob, Rabbit shot himself which ended season 2.

See also
 Semyon Mogilevich
 Marat Balagula
 Evsei Agron
 Boris Nayfeld
 Mishka Yaponchik
 Akhat Bragin
 Ukrainian oligarchs
 Corruption in Ukraine
 Human trafficking in Ukraine

References

Mafia
Organized crime by ethnic or national origin
Transnational organized crime
Organized crime groups in the Czech Republic
Organised crime groups in Italy
Organised crime groups in Israel
Organized crime groups in Slovakia
Crime in the Soviet Union
Organised crime groups in Ukraine
Organized crime groups in the United States
Gangs in Florida
Gangs in New York City